{{Infobox concert
| concert_tour_name = The Boy Meets World Tour
| image             = Boy Meets World Tour poster.png
| image_size        = 240px
| alt               =
| image_caption     =
| artist            = Drake
| album             = ViewsMore Life
| start_date        = 
| end_date          = 
| number_of_legs    = 2
| number_of_shows   = 43
| gross             =$55 million ($ million in  dollars)
|misc 
| last_tour         = Summer Sixteen Tour(2016)
| this_tour         = Boy Meets World Tour (2017)
| next_tour         = Aubrey & the Three Migos Tour(2018)
| Misc              = 
}}

The Boy Meets World Tour was the fifth headlining tour by Canadian recording artist Drake, to support his album Views (2016), and his playlist More Life'' (2017). The European leg began on January 28, 2017, at the Ziggo Dome in Amsterdam and concluded at the same venue on March 29, 2017. The opening acts for the European leg were the Canadian R&B duo dvsn, along with Young Thug for the UK and Ireland concerts. An Australia and New Zealand leg began on November 3, 2017, in Auckland, New Zealand and ended in Melbourne, Australia on November 20, 2017. The opening acts for the Australian and New Zealand concerts were Boi-1da and Pi'erre Bourne, both performing DJ sets.

Set list

Leg 1

"Free Smoke"
"Trophies"
"Started from the Bottom"
"Headlines"
"HYFR (Hell Ya Fucking Right)"
"0 to 100"
"Keep the Family Close"
"9"
"Still Here"
"Child's Play"
"Feel No Ways"
"Western Road Flows"
"Worst Behavior"
"We Made It"
"Blessings" 
"All Me"
"Versace"
"Pop That"
"Over"
"I'm on One"
"Up All Night"
"Miss Me"
"Crew Love"
"Successful"
"Hotline Bling"
"Hold On, We're Going Home"
"The Motto"
"Right Hand"
"For Free" (DJ Khaled cover)
"My Way" 
"Jumpman"
"Work" 
"Take Care"
"Too Good"
"Controlla"
"One Dance"
"KMT" 
"Pop Style"
"Know Yourself"
"Energy"
"Fake Love"
"Legend"

Leg 2

"Free Smoke"
"Trophies"
"Started from the Bottom"
"Headlines"
"HYFR (Hell Ya Fucking Right)"
"0 to 100"
"Worst Behavior"
"We Made It"
"Blessings" 
"All Me"
"Versace"
"Pop That"
"Over"
"I'm on One"
"Up All Night"
"Miss Me"
"Crew Love"
"Hotline Bling"
"Hold On, We're Going Home"
"Passionfruit"
"Teenage Fever"
"The Motto"
"For Free" 
"My Way"  
"Both" 
"Portland"
"Jumpman"
"Work" (Rihanna cover)
"Take Care"
"Too Good"
"Blem"
"Controlla"
"One Dance"
"KMT" 
"Pop Style"
"Gyalchester"
"Know Yourself"
"Energy"
"Fake Love"
"Legend"

Special acts

January 28, 2017: Giggs
January 30, 2017: Giggs, Kyla, Section Boyz
February 1, 2017: Travis Scott, Giggs, Section Boyz
February 4, 2017: Krept & Konan, Dave, Giggs, Kyla
February 20, 22, 2017: Giggs
February 23, 2017: Krept & Konan, Giggs, Jorja Smith Monkz24
February 25, 2017: The Weeknd, Giggs
February 26, 2017: Popcaan, Giggs
March 7, 2017: Baka, Popcaan, Pressa
March 9, 2017: Baka, Popcaan, Pressa
March 12, 13, 14, 2017: Nicki Minaj, Giggs, Popcaan, dvsn
March 20, 2017: Giggs, Skepta, Nicki Minaj, Trey Songz, Popcaan, Jorja Smith
March 22, 23, 28, 2017: Giggs, Popcaan

Tour dates

Notes

References 

2017 concert tours
Concert tours of Europe
Concert tours of the United Kingdom
Drake (musician) concert tours